The Kemihaara Wilderness Area is a wilderness reserve in Finland. It was established in 1991 like all the other 11 wilderness areas in Lapland. It is governed by the Metsähallitus.

The park is bordered by Urho Kekkonen National Park in the north and the river Kemijoki in the east.

See also
 Wilderness areas of Finland

References

Protected areas established in 1991
1991 establishments in Finland
Wilderness areas of Finland